Friedrich Emil Ferdinand Heinrich Graf Kleist von Nollendorf (9 April 1762 – 17 February 1823), born and died in Berlin, was a Prussian field marshal and a member of the old  family von Kleist.

Biography
Kleist entered the Prussian Army in 1778 and served in the War of the Bavarian Succession and the French Revolutionary Wars. By 1799, Kleist had been promoted to major and was put in command of a battalion of grenadiers.

Kleist served in the Napoleonic Wars and fought at Jena. In 1807 he went on extended leave but by 1808 he was put in command of an infantry brigade and the next year he was made commandant of Berlin. During the War of Liberation he was given a corps with which he fought in the battles of Kulm and Leipzig. In 1814, he was given the title Count of Nollendorf (from the German name of the town Nakléřov, now part of Petrovice in the Czech Republic) for his decisive role in this battle.

After Leipzig, Kleist blockaded the fortress of Erfurt, bringing about its surrender after which, in early 1814, he marched his troops into France, where his corps was attached to Blücher's army. He then fought in the battle of Laon and in the attack on Paris. During the Hundred Days, Kleist was given command of a Prussian corps (the North German Corps) which was to operate independently from Blücher's Army of the Lower Rhine; he was therefore not involved in the battles of Ligny and Waterloo.

Notes

References

Further reading

  (PDF; 2,1 MB)]
 
 
 Denkmal in Merseburg

1762 births
1823 deaths
Counts of Germany
Friedrich
Field marshals of Prussia
Prussian commanders of the Napoleonic Wars
Military personnel from Berlin
People from the Margraviate of Brandenburg
Recipients of the Order of St. George of the Second Degree
German military personnel of the French Revolutionary Wars